is a former Japanese football player.

Playing career
Iwata was born in Gifu Prefecture on September 23, 1981. He joined the J1 League club Nagoya Grampus Eight as part of the youth team in 2000. However he did not play much until 2001. In 2002, he moved to Singapore and joined Clementi Khalsa. In October 2002, he returned to Japan and joined the Japan Football League (JFL) club SC Tottori. He played in many matches until 2004. In 2005, he moved to the Regional Leagues club FC Gifu based in his local area. The club was promoted to the JFL in 2007 and the J2 League in 2008. He retired at the end of the 2008 season.

Club statistics

References

External links

1981 births
Living people
Association football people from Gifu Prefecture
Japanese footballers
J1 League players
J2 League players
Japan Football League players
Nagoya Grampus players
Gainare Tottori players
FC Gifu players
Association football midfielders